Basinski may refer to:
 Edwin Frank Basinski (born 1922), former infielder in Major League Baseball
 Ihar Basinski (born 1963), Belarusian sports shooter
 William Basinski (born 1958), American composer
 Michael Basinski (born 1950), American text, visual and sound poet